Paphiopedilum charlesworthii is a species of plant in the family Orchidaceae.

Distribution and habitat 
Restricted in distribution to the Shan States of northern Burma (Myanmar) and adjacent bordering areas of Thailand and Yunnan, China. It grows in humus and vegetative debris on limestone rock.

References 

 Braem, G. & Chiron, G. Paphiopedilum, Tropicalia, France, 2003.
 Cribb, P. The Genus Paphiopedilum, Second Edition, Natural History Publications (Borneo) Sdn. Bhd., 1998.

External links 

charlesworthii
Orchids of Myanmar
Orchids of Thailand
Orchids of Yunnan